Barbine ("little beards", singular: barbina) is a type of long strand Italian pasta that is very similar to capellini. It is generally available in a coiled nest shape.

During the Renaissance, they were considered the epitome of culinary art because they were very difficult to make so thin. Usually available in coiled nest form, they are typically served in a broth or with a light sauce.

See also
 Capellini

References

Types of pasta